Torrecillas is a barrio in the municipality of Morovis, Puerto Rico. Torrecillas has eight sectors and its population in 2010 was 623. A USDA Rural Development field office is located on the Torrecillas side of Sector La Línea on PR-6622.

History
Puerto Rico was ceded by Spain in the aftermath of the Spanish–American War under the terms of the Treaty of Paris of 1898 and became an unincorporated territory of the United States. In 1899, the United States Department of War conducted a census of Puerto Rico finding that the population of Torrecillas barrio was 572.

Hurricane Maria hit on September 20, 2017, and six months later a community, of about 300 residents in Torrecillas, reported their electrical power had not yet been restored.

Sectors

Barrios (which are roughly comparable to minor civil divisions) in turn are further subdivided into smaller local populated place areas/units called sectores (sectors in English). The types of sectores may vary, from normally sector to urbanización to reparto to barriada to residencial, among others.

The following sectors are in Torrecillas barrio:

, and  
.

Gallery
Scenes in Torrecillas:

See also

 List of communities in Puerto Rico

References

External links
 

Barrios of Morovis, Puerto Rico